The Bethune–Cookman Wildcats women's basketball team represents Bethune–Cookman University in the sport of basketball. The Wildcats competes in the NCAA Division I and the Southwestern Athletic Conference (SWAC). They play their home games in Moore Gymnasium on Bethune–Cookman University campus in Daytona Beach, Florida.

Postseason appearances
The Wildcats have appeared in three Women's National Invitation Tournaments, due to winning the regular season MEAC title in those years. The 2016 appearance was their first ever postseason appearance, along with their first title of any kind since 1984 (at that time, the MEAC Tournament title did not go to the NCAA Tournament). Their record is 0–3.

References

External links